Angelica is a census-designated place in the towns of Angelica and Maple Grove in Shawano County, Wisconsin, United States. Its population was 92 as of the 2010 census.

Demographics

References

Census-designated places in Shawano County, Wisconsin
Census-designated places in Wisconsin